Babakina caprinsulensis is a species of sea slug, an aeolid nudibranch in the family Babakinidae, according to Gosliner T. M., Gonzáles-Duarte M. M. & Cervera J. L. (2007).

It is found in shallow water along part of the coast of North Island, New Zealand.

References 

Babakinidae
Gastropods described in 1974